Alexander Cunningham (born 9 June 1936) is an Australian rower. He competed in the men's eight event at the 1960 Summer Olympics.

References

External links
 
 

1936 births
Living people
Australian male rowers
Olympic rowers of Australia
Rowers at the 1960 Summer Olympics
Rowers from Western Australia
20th-century Australian people